The 22nd Texas Infantry Regiment was a unit of volunteers recruited in Texas that fought in the Confederate States Army during the American Civil War. In August 1862, the regiment was enrolled in Confederate service, and for its entire career served west of the Mississippi River in the region known as the Trans-Mississippi Department. The unit was assigned to the 1st Brigade of the Texas infantry division known as Walker's Greyhounds. In 1863, the regiment played a secondary role at Milliken's Bend. Within the month of April 1864, the regiment fought in three major battles at Mansfield, Pleasant Hill, and Jenkins' Ferry. Though the formal surrender occurred on 26 May 1865, the soldiers disbanded to their homes before that date.

Service
On 16 October 1864, Captain John Guynes of Company F was shot for encouraging his soldiers to desert. He was motivated by the belief that the regiment was going to transfer to the east bank of the Mississippi River. Guynes was popular with his men and respected by other officers, however, appeals to spare his life were denied.

Notes

References

 

Units and formations of the Confederate States Army from Texas
1862 establishments in Texas
Military units and formations established in 1862
1865 disestablishments in Texas
Military units and formations disestablished in 1865